The 1993 Big West Conference men's basketball tournament was held March 12–14 at the Long Beach Arena in Long Beach, California.

Long Beach State upset top-seeded New Mexico State in the final, 70–62, to capture their second PCAA/Big West title (and first since 1977).

The 49ers subsequently received an automatic bid to the 1993 NCAA tournament. Regular-season champions, and tournament runners-up, New Mexico State received an at-large bid.

Format
One minor change was made to the tournament format this season despite the Big West maintaining its eight-team tournament.

All eight participating teams (the two teams with the worst conference regular season records were not included) were placed into the first round, with teams seeded and paired based on regular-season records. After the first round, however, teams were now re-seeded so the highest-remaining team was paired with the lowest-remaining time in one semifinal with the other two teams slotted into the other semifinal.

Nevada, in their first year as Big West members (moving from the Big Sky), failed to qualify for the tournament. The Wolf Pack replaced outgoing Fresno State, who left to join the WAC.

Bracket

References

Big West Conference men's basketball tournament
Tournament
Big West Conference men's basketball tournament
Big West Conference men's basketball tournament